The 2016–17 Louisiana Ragin' Cajuns men's basketball team represented the University of Louisiana at Lafayette during the 2016–17 NCAA Division I men's basketball season. The Ragin' Cajuns were led by seventh-year head coach Bob Marlin and played their home games at the Cajundome, with four home games at Blackham Coliseum, as members in the Sun Belt Conference. They finished the season 21–12, 10–8 in Sun Belt play to finish in a three-way tie for sixth place. They defeated Little Rock before losing to Georgia State in the quarterfinals of the Sun Belt tournament. Despite having 21 wins, they did not participate in a postseason tournament.

Previous season
The Ragin' Cajuns finished the 2015–16 season 19–15, 12–8 in Sun Belt play to finish in fourth place. They beat South Alabama in the quarterfinals of the Sun Belt tournament before losing to Little Rock in the semifinals. They were invited to the CollegeInsider.com Tournament where they defeated Texas A&M–Corpus Christi and Furman before losing in the quarterfinals to UC Irvine.

Roster

Schedule and results

|-
!colspan=12 style=| Exhibition

|-
!colspan=12 style=| Non-conference regular season

|-
!colspan=9 style=| Sun Belt regular season

|-
!colspan=12 style=| Sun Belt tournament

References

Louisiana Ragin' Cajuns men's basketball seasons
Louisiana-Lafayette
Louisiana
Louisiana